, provisionally known as , is a trans-Neptunian object. It is an inner classical Kuiper belt object in the definition by Gladman, Marsden, and Van Laerhoven (e<0.24). Its inclination of almost 25 degrees disqualifies it as such in Marc Buie's definition. It is also not listed as a scattered disc object by the Minor Planet Center. It was discovered  by Michael E. Brown, Chad Trujillo and David L. Rabinowitz on October 3, 2004 at the Palomar Observatory.

Light-curve analysis suggests it is not a dwarf planet.

, it is 39.2 AU from the Sun.

References

External links
 

Possible dwarf planets
2004 TY364
2004 TY364
2004 TY364
Classical Kuiper belt objects
Scattered disc and detached objects
20041003